The Welsh Presbyterian Church is in St John Street, Chester, Cheshire, England.  The church was built in 1866, and designed by W. & G. Audsley of Liverpool.  It is constructed with a yellow sandstone front, brick sides and rear, and a slate roof.  The plan consists of a simple rectangle, with an apse at the east end, and a narrower single-storey narthex at the west (entrance) end.  The narthex is supported by octagonal piers at the corners and two granite columns between them.  On each side of the narthex is a lancet window.  Above the narthex is a large rose window, with a lancet window above, and a cross finial on the gable.  The church is recorded in the National Heritage List for England as a designated Grade II listed building.  The wall and the iron railings and gates in front of the church are included in the listing.

See also

Grade II listed buildings in Chester (east)

References

External links

Presbyterian Church of Wales
Churches completed in 1866
19th-century Presbyterian churches
Grade II listed churches in Cheshire
Grade II listed buildings in Chester
Churches in Chester
Gothic Revival church buildings in England
Gothic Revival architecture in Cheshire
Presbyterian churches in England
1866 establishments in England
19th-century churches in the United Kingdom